The 1893–94 British Home Championship was an edition of the annual international football tournament played between the British Home Nations. It was won by Scotland in a close competition in which neither Scotland nor England lost a game but Scotland managed to accumulate one more point than England with a victory over Ireland.

Wales and Ireland began the tournament, Wales winning the match easily 4–1 and gaining an early advantage. Ireland's second match was against England and the Irish managed to hold their opponents to a 2–2 draw in a very tough match. England recovered to beat Wales, scoring five goals, but this total was matched by Scotland in their first match. Scotland also managed to beat Ireland, the Irish again only narrowly missing out on victory, losing 1–2. In the final game of the competition England and Scotland played, Scotland only needing a draw to achieve the trophy. Despite a very strong encounter, the Scots held England to a 2–2 draw and took the tournament by a single point.

Table

Results

Winning squad

References

British
Home
Home
Home
British Home Championships
Brit
Brit